Assault causing bodily harm is a statutory offence of assault in Canada with aggravating factors. It is committed by anyone who, in committing an assault, causes bodily harm to the complainant. It is the Canadian equivalent to the statutory offence in England and Wales of assault occasioning actual bodily harm.  In Canada, a consensual fight is not considered an assault, but one cannot consent to an assault causing bodily harm.

Bodily harm

Bodily harm is defined as any hurt or injury to a person that interferes with the health or comfort of the person and that is more than merely transient or trifling in nature. This definition is similar (if it is not word for word) to the common law definition of actual bodily harm stated in R v. Donovan and repeated in R v. Chan-Fook, where the reference to transient or trifling injuries is taken as applying to actual bodily harm rather than bodily harm.

Mode of trial and sentence

Assault causing bodily harm is a hybrid offence or dual offence. It is punishable, on conviction on indictment, with imprisonment for a term not exceeding ten years, or, on summary conviction, with imprisonment for a term not exceeding 18 months.  This is a case where the sentence for the offence is specifically defined as greater than the default punishment for summary matters, which is normally up to 6 months.

Comparison to aggravated battery

In many US jurisdictions, aggravated battery is an equivalent to assault causing or occasioning bodily harm.  Unlike under Canadian criminal law, however, aggravated battery is always indictable (locally known as a felony).

References

 

Canadian criminal law